CentraCom Interactive is a telecommunications company, which provides fiber-optic communication, cable internet, wireless broadband, DSL service, phone service, and cable TV to much of central, north and western Utah. CentraCom is DBA of Central Utah Telephone, Inc.

Central Utah Telephone was founded in 1903 as the first Independent rural telephone company in Fairview, Utah.

Subsidiaries
 Central Utah Telephone
 Skyline Telecom
 Bear Lake Communications
 Central Telecom Services, LLC
 CUTV
 Cut.net
 CentraCom Business Services
 CentraCom Long Distance

Services
 Fiber-optic
 Cable Internet
 Wireless broadband
 DSL
 Cable Television
 HDTV
 ISDN
 Dedicated Internet Service
 Voice Services

History
Ezekial Cheney, Elsberry Garlic and Oscar Norman started a local telephone system in Fairview, Utah and named it Fairview Telephone Company on July 4, 1903. In their first year, Fairview Telephone Company only sold and installed four telephones.

After several changes in ownership, Roy B. Cox purchased the telephone system on July 1, 1919. Iven Cox took over management of the business from Roy in 1940. He operated the company until his retirement in 1979. Retaining the titles of president and chairman of the board, Iven placed his son I Branch Cox in charge of running the business. Branch's cousin, Eddie L. Cox, was assigned the office manager.

On June 18, 2001, Lynch Interactive Corporation, a company based in Rye, New York, purchased Central Utah Telephone and its subsidiaries.  Lynch Interactive (AMEX:LIC) left all existing management and staff in place.

In 2001, Qwest Communications, successor to U.S. West, divested itself of a number of rural exchanges in Utah. Central Utah Telephone acquired the Mt. Pleasant – Spring City exchange. Additionally, in that same sale Central Utah Telephone extended their westward reach to the Utah–Nevada border by purchasing the Dugway and Wendover, Utah exchanges. With the completion of these purchases, the geographical footprint of Central Utah Telephone, Inc. covered nearly one sixth of the land mass of the State of Utah and touches the states of Idaho and Nevada.

In 2005, CentraCom purchased the Precis Communications cable TV system in the Sevier and Sanpete Counties. This acquisition launched their cable TV service and business IP services. This purchased included an extensive fiber optic network. These fiber optic lines extend from Monroe, Utah to Salt Lake City and from Salt Lake City to Wendover, Utah. In 2009, CentraCom joined Western FiberNet.

Sources

Cable television companies of the United States
Internet service providers of the United States
Communications in Utah